Zico Locquiao Bailey (born August 27, 2000) is an American professional soccer player who plays as a right-back for San Antonio FC.

Personal life
Zico is the younger brother of Kainoa Bailey who is an international footballer for the Philippines.

College career 
Bailey joined the Cal State Fullerton Titans men's soccer ahead of the 2018 NCAA Division I men's soccer season. During his freshman year, Bailey played in 21 matches for the Titans, starting 17 matches.

Club career
Bailey made his professional debut in a 1–1 draw with Orange County SC. He replaced Jorge Hernandez after 82 minutes.

After a successful season with Cal State Fullerton, Bailey signed with Allsvenskan side Kalmar FF in April 2019. Three months later, on July 16, it was announced that he had moved to Danish 2nd Division club FC Helsingør.

On December 12, 2019, Bailey moved to Major League Soccer (MLS) side FC Cincinnati ahead of their 2020 season. Cincinnati acquired the defender’s Homegrown rights from LA Galaxy in exchange for FC Cincinnati’s natural 4th-round 2020 MLS SuperDraft pick. Bailey made his MLS debut with FC Cincinnati on October 7, 2020, replacing an injured Greg Garza in the 30th minute.

Bailey was released by Cincinnati following their 2022 season.

On March 16, 2023, Bailey signed a short-term deal with USL Championship side San Antonio FC.

International career
Born in United States to a Jamaican father and a Filipina mother, Bailey is eligible to represent  Jamaica, United States and Philippines at international level.

Career statistics

References

External links
 Profile at FC Cincinnati
 CSU Fullerton Profile
 

2000 births
Living people
Association football defenders
American soccer players
United States men's youth international soccer players
American sportspeople of Jamaican descent
American sportspeople of Filipino descent
American expatriate soccer players
Cal State Fullerton Titans men's soccer players
LA Galaxy II players
Kalmar FF players
FC Helsingør players
FC Cincinnati players
FC Cincinnati 2 players
San Antonio FC players
USL Championship players
People from Henderson, Nevada
Soccer players from Las Vegas
Soccer players from Nevada
Expatriate footballers in Sweden
American expatriate sportspeople in Sweden
Expatriate men's footballers in Denmark
American expatriate sportspeople in Denmark
Homegrown Players (MLS)
Major League Soccer players
MLS Next Pro players